Elissa is a 1900 book by English author H. Rider Haggard. It consists of two stories:
Elissa; or The Doom of Zimbabwe
Black Heart and White Heart: A Zulu Idyll

Reception
The Outlook, reviewing Elissa, stated "As a story the tale is somewhat overwritten and improbable".

References

External links
Complete book at Project Gutenberg
Images and bibliographic information for various editions of Elissa at SouthAfricaBooks.com
 

Novels by H. Rider Haggard
British adventure novels
1900 British novels
Novels set in Zimbabwe